Pustulatirus ogum is a species of sea snail, a marine gastropod mollusk in the family Fasciolariidae, the spindle snails, the tulip snails and their allies.

Description

Distribution

References

 Landau B. & Vermeij G. (2012) The Peristerniinae (Mollusca: Gastropoda: Buccinidea, Fasciolariidae) from the Neogene of Venezuela. Cainozoic Research 9: 88-99

External links
 Lyons, W. G.; Snyder, M. A. (2013). The Genus Pustulatirus Vermeij and Snyder, 2006 (Gastropoda: Fasciolariidae: Peristerniinae) in the Western Atlantic, with Descriptions of Three New Species. Zootaxa. 3636(1): 35

Fasciolariidae
Gastropods described in 1979